Elizabeth Rodrigues Gomes (born January 15, 1965) is a Brazilian paralympic athlete, who competes in the F52 class. She won the gold medal in the women's discus throw F53 event at the 2020 Summer Paralympics in Tokyo, Japan.

Career 
Elizabeth competed at the 2008 Summer Paralympic Games as an athlete of wheelchair basketball.

She is coached by Rosi Farias at club level, and Amaury Wagner Verissimo at national team level.

She competed at the 2015 Parapan American Games, 2019 Parapan American Games, and 2019 World Para Athletics Championships.

References 

1965 births
Living people
Paralympic athletes of Brazil
Athletes (track and field) at the 2020 Summer Paralympics
Medalists at the 2020 Summer Paralympics
Paralympic gold medalists for Brazil
Brazilian female discus throwers
21st-century Brazilian women